Bakpia (- the name it is known by in Indonesia) or Hopia ( - the name it is known by in the Philippines) is a popular Indonesian and Philippine bean-filled moon cake-like pastry originally introduced by Fujianese immigrants in the urban centers of both nations around the turn of the twentieth century. It is a widely available inexpensive treat and a favoured gift for families, friends and relatives.

In Indonesia, it is also widely known as bakpia pathok, named after a suburb of Yogyakarta which specialises in the pastry. These sweet rolls are similar to bigger Indonesian pia, the only difference being the size.

Types of dough

Flaky type
The flaky type of bakpia uses Chinese puff pastry. Clear examples of this can be seen in China (especially Macau), Taiwan and countries with established Chinese diaspora communities such as Trinidad and Tobago and Guyana making this type the authentic Chinese hopia. In addition, there is more skill involved in making this type of hopia crust.

Cake-dough type
Philippine hopia also uses the cake-dough type in addition to the flaky type. It uses a soft cookie-dough similar in texture & taste to the wrapper-dough for fig newtons. This type is very similar to Japanese bean cakes, which grants it the name hopiang Hapon (“Japanese bean cake” in Filipino).

Fillings
Below are the four traditional and most popular bakpia fillings, though recently other fillings have been created such as cappuccino, cheese, chocolate, custard, durian, mango, pineapple, screwpine (pandan), and umbi talas (taro).

Mung bean 

The most popular flaky bakpia both in Indonesia and the Philippines is mung bean bakpia (Indonesian: bakpia kacang hijau; Tagalog and Visayan: hopiang munggo), sometimes referred to as hopiang matamís ("sweet hopia" in Tagalog). As its name implies, it is filled with sweet split mung bean paste.

Pork
Hopiang baboy (Tagalog and Visayan for "pork hopia") is filled with a savoury bread-crumb paste studded with candied wintermelon, flavoured with scallion and enriched with candied pork back fat, hence its name. This type of hopia is also sometimes referred to as hopiang maalat (Tagalog for "salty hopia").

Purple yam 

Ube hopia or hopiang ube is a variant of hopia from the Philippines which use purple yam (Visayan and Tagalog: ube/ubi). The filling is reminiscent of halayáng ube (ube jam), a traditional Filipino dessert eaten during Christmas season. Like other ube-based dishes, it has a unique, vivid violet colour and sweet taste.

Ube hopia was first introduced in the 1980s by Gerry Chua of Eng Bee Tin, a Chinese Filipino deli chain in the Binondo district of Manila noted for their fusion of Chinese and Filipino culinary traditions.

Azuki bean 
A variant from the Philippines that uses red azuki bean paste is called hopiang hapón (Filipino for "Japanese hopia"). It differs from other hopia in that it is made from cake dough. It is small and round and is similar in filling, crust texture, and style to the Japanese kuri manjū, hence its name. These are also often formed into cubes and cooked on a griddle one side at a time instead of being baked in an oven.

See also

 Bánh pía
Pan de monggo

References

Kue
Indonesian Chinese cuisine
Javanese cuisine
Indonesian fusion cuisine
Indonesian pastries
Indonesian desserts
Philippine cuisine
Philippine fusion cuisine
Chinese fusion cuisine
Legume dishes